Sir Hercules Langford, 1st Baronet (1626 – 1683) was an Anglo-Irish baronet, merchant and landowner. 

Langford was appointed High Sheriff of Antrim in 1661 and was High Sheriff of Meath in 1677. A devout Presbyterian, Langford was removed from the Commission of the Peace in Meath in the wake of Colonel Blood's plot to seize Dublin Castle. His estate was a centre of presbyterian worship, with a minister and a meeting-house supported by the family. On 19 August 1667 he was created a baronet, of Kilmackevett in the Baronetage of Ireland.

He married Mary Upton, a daughter of Henry Upton of Castle Upton, County Antrim. One of their daughters, Mary, married Sir John Rowley. Their sons were Arthur Langford and Henry Langford, both members of the Irish House of Commons, and Theophilus Langford.

References

1626 births
1683 deaths
17th-century Anglo-Irish people
Baronets in the Baronetage of Ireland
High Sheriffs of Antrim
High Sheriffs of Meath
Irish Presbyterians